Chasmogenus is a Neotropical genus of water scavenger beetles belonging to the family Hydrophilidae.

Taxonomy 
The genus Chasmogenus was described for the first time by David Sharp in 1882 for species from Guatemala and Panama.

Since 1919 the genus Crephelochares (from the Old World) was considered a synonym of Chasmogenus, but thanks to the results of a phylogenetic analysis involving molecular data, both taxa are now considered distinct genera on their own right.

Currently, a total of 36 species is identified and documented, most of them recorded from the Guiana Shield Region.

Description 
Small size (2.5–5.0 mm), bearing a clearly visible sutural stria; long maxillary palps; metafemora usually densely covered by hydrofuge pubescence. The external morphology in Chasmogenus is very uniform across species, so that most species can only be identified by the shape of the male genitalia.

By the presence of the sutural stria, in the Neotropical region, Chasmogenus can only be confused with some members of the genus Primocerus.

Habitat 
According to Girón and Short:

Species

 Chasmogenus acuminatus Smith and Short, 2020 
 Chasmogenus amplius Smith and Short, 2020 
 Chasmogenus australis García, 2000 
 Chasmogenus bariorum García, 2000 
 Chasmogenus barrae Short, 2005 
 Chasmogenus berbicensis Smith and Short, 2020 
 Chasmogenus brownsbergensis Smith and Short, 2020 
 Chasmogenus cajuina Alves, Clarkson and Lima, 2020 
 Chasmogenus castaneus Smith and Short, 2020 
 Chasmogenus clavijoi Smith and Short, 2020 
 Chasmogenus clinatus Glynn and Short, 2021 
 Chasmogenus cremnobates (Spangler, 1979) 
 Chasmogenus cuspifer Smith and Short, 2020 
 Chasmogenus flavomarginatus Smith and Short, 2020 
 Chasmogenus fluminensis Clarkson and Ferreira-Jr, 2014 
 Chasmogenus fragilis Sharp, 1882 
 Chasmogenus gato Smith and Short, 2020 
 Chasmogenus gironae Glynn and Short, 2021 
 Chasmogenus guianensis Smith and Short, 2020 
 Chasmogenus ignotus Smith and Short, 2020 
 Chasmogenus inpa Glynn and Short, 2021 
 Chasmogenus itatiaia Clarkson and Ferreira-Jr, 2014 
 Chasmogenus ligulatus Smith and Short, 2020 
 Chasmogenus lilianae Clarkson and Ferreira-Jr, 2014 
 Chasmogenus lineatus Smith and Short, 2020 
 Chasmogenus lorenzo Short, 2005 
 Chasmogenus pandus Smith and Short, 2020 
 Chasmogenus rufinasus (Knisch, 1924) 
 Chasmogenus ruidus Short, 2005 
 Chasmogenus sapucay Fernández, 1986 
 Chasmogenus schmits Smith and Short, 2020 
 Chasmogenus schoedli Short, 2005 
 Chasmogenus sinnamarensis Smith and Short, 2020 
 Chasmogenus tafelbergensis Smith and Short, 2020 
 Chasmogenus ubatuba Clarkson and Ferreira-Jr, 2014 
 Chasmogenus undulatus Smith and Short, 2020

References

Beetles of South America
Hydrophilidae